Gary Brooker  (29 May 1945 – 19 February 2022) was an English singer and pianist, and the founder and lead singer of the rock band Procol Harum.

Early life 
Born in Hackney Hospital, East London, on 29 May 1945, Brooker grew up in Hackney before the family moved out to Middlesex (Bush Hill Park and then to nearby Edmonton). His father Harry Brooker was a professional musician, playing pedal steel guitar with Felix Mendelssohn's Hawaiian Serenaders, and as a child Brooker learned to play piano, cornet, and trombone. In 1954 the family moved to the seaside resort of Southend-on-Sea, Essex, where Brooker attended Westcliff High School for Boys. His father died of a heart attack when Gary was 11 years old, forcing his mother to work in order to make ends meet, while Brooker himself took on a paper-round. When he left school, he went on to Southend Municipal College to study zoology and botany but dropped out to become a professional musician.

Career 
Brooker founded the Paramounts in 1962 with his guitarist friend, Robin Trower. The band gained respect within the burgeoning 1960s British R&B scene, which yielded the Beatles, the Animals, the Spencer Davis Group, the Rolling Stones, and many others. The Rolling Stones, in particular, were Paramounts fans, sharing the stage with them several times in the early 1960s.

In 1966, Brooker founded Procol Harum with his friend Keith Reid. "A Whiter Shade of Pale" is the worldwide hit for which Procol Harum is best known, but Brooker's melancholic vocals and emotive, eclectic piano playing were a key part of the band's musical mix. In the early years Brooker, Hammond organist Matthew Fisher, and Trower were the guiding musical forces behind the band, but after disparities in style became too much and Fisher and Trower left, Brooker was the clear leader. Brooker started a solo career and released the album No More Fear of Flying in 1979.

The same year, Brooker joined friend and neighbour Eric Clapton's band. With Brooker in the line-up, they released the studio album Another Ticket. Clapton fired the entire band in 1981, but he and Brooker remained good friends afterwards, and were for many years neighbours in the Surrey Hills. Brooker joined Clapton for several one-off benefit gigs over the years. Brooker sang lead vocal on the Alan Parsons Project song "Limelight", on their 1985 album, Stereotomy. Brooker sang the lead vocal of the song "No News from the Western Frontier", a single taken from the album Hi-Tec Heroes by the Dutch performer Ad Visser.

A new incarnation of Procol Harum, led by Brooker, continued touring the world, celebrating its 40th anniversary in July 2007 with two days of musical revels at St John's, Smith Square, in London. Brooker also toured with Ringo Starr's All-Starr Band in 1997 and 1999, and he was also a member of Bill Wyman's Rhythm Kings for several years, appearing on three of their albums and touring with the band. On 28 September 1996, as the Gary Brooker Ensemble, he organized a charity concert to raise funds for his local church, St Mary and All Saints, in Surrey. The resulting live CD of the concert, Within Our House, originally released on a fan club CD in a limited run of 1000 units, later became a collectable recording. His guests and supporting artists included Dave Bronze, Michael Bywater, Mark Brzezicki, and Robbie McIntosh.

Also in 1996, Brooker appeared in the Alan Parker film adaptation of Andrew Lloyd Webber's Evita starring Madonna, Jonathan Pryce, and Antonio Banderas. Playing the part of Juan Atilio Bramuglia, he sang the song "Rainbow Tour" with Peter Polycarpou and Antonio Banderas. Brooker said that his greatest single earning in his career was from his appearance in the film.

Brooker contributed to George Harrison's albums All Things Must Pass (1970), Somewhere in England (1981) and Gone Troppo (1982). On 29 November 2002 he was among musicians and singers participating in the Harrison tribute concert, Concert for George, at which he sang lead vocals on their version of "Old Brown Shoe".
In April 2005, as part of the Gary Brooker Ensemble, he played a sold out charity concert at Guildford Cathedral in aid of the tsunami appeal, playing a mixture of Procol Harum and solo songs and arrangements of classical and spiritual songs. His guests and supporting artists included Andy Fairweather Low and Paul Jones (ex-Manfred Mann).

On 28 October 2009, Brooker was presented with a BASCA in recognition of his unique contribution to music. In 2011 he organised and performed in a concert at his home Wintershall, in Bramley, Surrey, in aid of the charity HASTE (Heart and Stroke Trust Endeavour). His guest musicians included Eric Clapton, Jeff Beck, Andy Fairweather Low, Georgie Fame, and Lulu.

In May 2012, Procol Harum were forced to cancel the remainder of their dates in South Africa after Brooker fractured his skull following a fall in his hotel room in Cape Town. The fall came on Brooker's 67th birthday. The band was part of the British Invasion Tour of South Africa along with the Moody Blues and 10cc. Brooker again fell injuring himself, during the interval of a Procol Harum concert at London's Royal Festival Hall in March 2017. Returning to the stage after a longer than expected interval, Brooker's head was bandaged and it was later discovered that he had broken a finger. However, they continued touring until 2019, playing their final gig in Switzerland.

Personal life and death 
In July 1968, Brooker married Françoise Riedo ("Franky"), a Swiss au pair, whom he met circa 1965. The couple had no children.

Brooker was a supporter of the Countryside Alliance and played in concerts to raise funds for the organization. On 14 June 2003, he was appointed a Member of the Order of the British Empire (MBE) in the 2003 Queen's Birthday Honours, in recognition of his charitable services.

Brooker died from cancer at his home in Surrey on 19 February 2022, at the age of 76.

"A Whiter Shade of Pale" authorship lawsuit 

In 2005, former Procol Harum organist Matthew Fisher filed suit in the High Court against Brooker and his publisher, claiming that he co-wrote the music for the song. Fisher won the case on 20 December 2006 but was awarded 40% of the composers' share of the music copyright, rather than the 50% he was seeking and was not granted royalties for the period before 2005.

Solo discography

Studio albums 
1979: No More Fear of Flying (AUS #94) 
1982: Lead Me to the Water
1985: Echoes in the Night

Live album 
1996: Within Our House

Singles 
1979: "Savannah"
1979: "Say It Ain't So Joe"
1979: "No More Fear of Flying"
1980: "Leave The Candle"
1982: "Cycle (Let It Flow)"
1982: "Low Flying Birds"
1982: "The Angler"
1984: "The Long Goodbye"
1985: "Two Fools in Love"
1987: "No News from the Western Frontier" (single in the Netherlands, taken from Ad Visser's album Hi-Tec Heroes)

Contributor 
1970: All Things Must Pass (George Harrison) – piano
1971: Distant Light (The Hollies) – organ on track 11, "Long Dark Road"
1975: Peter and the Wolf (Jack Lancaster and Robin Lumley, producers) — synthesizer
1978: Juppanese (Mickey Jupp – keyboards, organ, piano, producer (side 2)
1978: Five Three One – Double Seven O Four (The Hollies) – vocals on track 4, "Harlequin"
1981: Another Ticket (Eric Clapton) – track 8, "Catch Me If You Can"
1985: Stereotomy (Alan Parsons Project) – lead vocals on track 4, "Limelight"
1993: The Red Shoes (Kate Bush) – Hammond on track 2, "And So Is Love", track 9, "Constellations of the Heart" and track 12, "You're the One"
1999: Drivers Eyes (Ian McDonald) – track 11, "Let There Be Light"
2003: Concert for George (Memorial concert for George Harrison)
2005: Aerial (Kate Bush) – organ, vocals

References 

Citations

Sources

External links 

 ClassicBands.com: Procol Harum
 Gary Brooker at Discogs
 
 Gary Brooker at 45cat.com
 "Gary Brooker, lead singer of English band Procol Harum, dies, aged 76" – obituary by Harriet Sherwood at theguardian.com

1945 births
2022 deaths
20th-century British male musicians
20th-century English male singers
20th-century English singers
20th-century pianists
21st-century British male musicians
21st-century English male singers
21st-century English singers
21st-century pianists
Bill Wyman's Rhythm Kings members
British male pianists
Deaths from cancer in England
English male singer-songwriters
English pianists
English rock singers
Members of the Order of the British Empire
People from the London Borough of Hackney
Procol Harum members
Progressive rock keyboardists
Ringo Starr & His All-Starr Band members
Singers from London
The Paramounts members